Li Cheng (919–967), courtesy name Xiánxī (咸熙), was a Chinese painter of the Song dynasty. He was influenced by Jing Hao and Juran. Li Cheng, Fan Kuan, and Guan Tong became known as the "three great rival artists".

Life 
Li Cheng lived in Qingzhou (now part of Weifang, Shandong) during the Five Dynasties and Ten Kingdoms period and the early Song dynasty. His ancestry was from the Tang dynasty imperial family, the Li (李) clan, which had fallen from power in 907 with the dynasty's collapse.

He learned painting from Jing Hao and Guan Tong before turning to focus on nature and developing his own style. He was also a poet and literary stylist, but regarded these as secondary endeavors, and he did not seek government office. Many nobles sought out Li Cheng's services, but he never accepted. An official named Sun Anzhi desired a painting from Li Cheng so ardently, he offered Li a prestigious government post, but Li Cheng refused. Sun then paid an acquaintance of Li Cheng to steal a painting, earning the artist's lifelong enmity. During his later years, he took to travel and died in Huaiyang County.

Li Cheng did many landscape paintings with diluted ink, a technique called "treating ink like gold", which gives the appearance of a foggy dream world. In his day, he was considered the greatest landscape painter of all time. His paintings carried on an artistic dialogue with those of Wu Daoxuan. Li Cheng primarily portrayed the landscapes of Shandong. Artists of later generations, such as Guo Xi, modeled their teaching on his painting style and methods.

His works include “Jigger", "Joy in Fishing", "Cold crow", and "Landscape". One extant painting, "Reading Stele Nest Stone", was a collaboration with Wang Xiao.

Art

See also
Culture of the Song dynasty
Chinese painting
Chinese art
History of Chinese art

References

Reading 
Sullivan, Michael. The Arts of China. Berkeley: University of California Press, 2008
Chinese painting - Five Dynasties (907-960) and Ten Kingdoms (902-978)
宣和画谱 - Chinese Text Project

External links
Landscapes Clear and Radiant: The Art of Wang Hui (1632-1717), an exhibition catalog from The Metropolitan Museum of Art (fully available online as PDF), which contains material on Li Cheng (see index)
http://ctext.org/wiki.pl?if=en&res=668529&searchu=李成&remap=g

919 births
967 deaths
Song dynasty landscape painters
People from Weifang
Painters from Shandong
Five Dynasties and Ten Kingdoms landscape painters
10th-century Chinese painters